Kastraki may refer to several places in Greece: 

Kastraki, Aetolia-Acarnania, a village in the municipal unit Stratos, Aetolia-Acarnania
Kastraki, Arcadia, a village in the municipal unit Tropaia, Arcadia
Kastraki, Corinthia, a village in the municipal unit Nemea, Corinthia
Kastraki, Kastoria, a municipal unit in Kastoria regional unit
Kastraki, Phocis, a village in the municipal unit Efpalio, Phocis
Kastraki, Trikala, a village in the municipal unit Kalampaka, Trikala regional unit
Kastraki (lake), an artificial lake in Aetolia-Acarnania
Kastraki Beach and village on Naxos, Cyclades